Michael John Tomasky (born October 13, 1960) is an American columnist, progressive commentator, and author.  He is the editor of The New Republic and editor in chief of Democracy. He has been a special correspondent for Newsweek, The Daily Beast, a contributing editor for The American Prospect, and a contributor to The New York Review of Books.

Life and career
Tomasky was born and raised in Morgantown, West Virginia, the son of Maria (Aluisi) and Michael Tomasky, a trial attorney. He is of Serbian and Italian descent. He attended West Virginia University as an undergraduate and then studied political science in graduate school at New York University. His work has also appeared in The New York Times Book Review, The Washington Post, Harper's Weekly, The Nation, The Village Voice, The New York Review of Books, Dissent, Lingua Franca, George, and GQ. He lives with his wife Sarah and daughter (Margot Julianna Kerr Tomasky, born July 6, 2010) in Silver Spring, Maryland.

From 1995 to 2002, Tomasky was a columnist at New York magazine, where he wrote the "City Politic" column. He was later executive editor of liberal magazine The American Prospect, and remains a contributing editor. On October 23, 2007, Guardian America was launched with Tomasky as its editor. On March 3, 2009, he replaced Kenneth Baer as editor of U.S. political journal Democracy, at which time his title at The Guardian changed to editor-at-large. In May 2011 Tomasky left The Guardian to join Newsweek / The Daily Beast as a special correspondent. He is the editor of The New Republic.

Tomasky is the author of Left for Dead: The Life, Death, and Possible Resurrection of Progressive Politics in America (1996), and of Hillary's Turn: Inside Her Improbable, Victorious Senate Campaign (2001), a chronicle of Hillary Clinton's successful election to the Senate in 2000.

Bibliography

Books

Book reviews

References

External links
Column archive at The American Prospect
Column archive at The Daily Beast
Democracy
Column archive at The Guardian
Column archive at The New York Review of Books
Conversations with Charlie Rose

Video discussions/debates involving Tomasky on Bloggingheads.tv

Living people
1960 births
American columnists
American male journalists
American people of Italian descent
American people of Serbian descent
American political commentators
American political writers
Journalists from West Virginia
Morgantown High School alumni
New York University alumni
People from Morgantown, West Virginia
The New York Review of Books people
The Village Voice people
West Virginia University alumni
Writers from West Virginia
The New Republic people